Matthew Cartwright House may refer to:

Matthew Cartwright House (San Augustine, Texas), listed on the National Register of Historic Places in San Augustine County, Texas
Matthew Cartwright House (Terrell, Texas), listed on the National Register of Historic Places in Kaufman County, Texas